In hip hop culture, a grill (most commonly referred to as grills or grillz), also known as fronts or golds, is a type of dental jewelry worn over the teeth. Grills are made of metal and are generally removable. They began to be worn by hip-hop artists in New York City in the early 1980s, and upgraded during the 1990s in Oakland. They became even more widely popular during the mid-2000s due to the rise of Southern hip hop rap and the more mainstream pop culture status hip hop attained.

Characteristics and wearer demographics 
Grills are made of several types of metal (often silver, gold or platinum) that are sometimes inlaid with precious stones; they are generally removable, though some may be permanently attached to the teeth. Gold grills can be made from 10-karat, up to 24-karat gold. The gold can be tinted yellow, white and rose color.

Grills can cost anywhere from one hundred dollars to thousands of dollars, depending on the materials used and the number of teeth covered.

As of 2006, grills were most often worn by 18- to 35-year-old African-American male hip-hop listeners. Grills received mainstream attention, including on network television, when, during the 2012 Summer Olympics, Olympic swimmer Ryan Lochte posed with a grill that sported stones in the design of a U.S. flag; he had previously worn diamond grills after earlier competitions.

History 

The insertion of gems into teeth predates hip hop culture. Hip hop artists such as Raheem the Dream and Kilo Ali began wearing grills in the early 1980s; 

New Yorker Eddie Plein, owner of Famous Eddie's Gold Teeth, is often credited with kickstarting the trend in New York during the mid 1980's.  Plein began adapting dental crowns from single teeth into multiple caps thus creating the first grills originally known as fronts or caps. His first notable celebrity customer was gangster rapper Just Ice who would popularise gold fronts by donning his custom teeth on the cover of his 1987 album Kool and Deadly photographed by Janette Beckman. The teeth would appear on both the front and back covers of the artwork.

With his popularity rising, Plein made gold caps for Flavor Flav, and then outfitted New York rappers including Big Daddy Kane and Kool G. Rap.  He later moved to Atlanta, where he designed ever-more-elaborate grills for rappers like OutKast, Goodie Mob, Ludacris, and Lil Jon.  Other writers have cited Slick Rick and Afrika Bambaataa as an important early contributor to the popularity of grills.

Grills remained popular in the Southern U.S., especially in Houston or Memphis, even as they rose and fell from popularity elsewhere, and the rise of Dirty South rappers in the 2000s spurred a nationwide grill trend.  During this time, grills frequently appeared in hip hop music, most notably in the 2005 number one single "Grillz," by Nelly, Paul Wall, Big Gipp, and Ali, and in other Paul Wall songs. Wall is known for his grill business as well as his rapping; his clients include Kanye West and Cam'ron.

Grills maintained their popularity into the 2010s, with French grillmaker Dolly Cohen creating custom oral jewelry for Rihanna, Cara Delevingne, and Rita Ora.
In 2015, DJ Khaled created a song based around grills, "Gold Slugs" (feat. Chris Brown, August Alsina & Fetty Wap). Gold Slugs also is used as a term similar to grills with the same meaning.

Manufacture 

While early grills could not be removed easily and involved reshaping the tooth itself to fit the grill, grills are today made from custom dental molds.  For more expensive grills, a dentist takes a mold of the wearer's front teeth with a quick set alginate.  A tooth mold is obtained by filling the alginate negative with buff stone, then the buff stone is used to fit the grill to the unique set of teeth.  However, for inexpensive novelty grills, a jeweler may make an impression by having the wearer bite into dental putty or wax softened in water, or the wearer may do this themselves.  Such grills may be less comfortable or dependable than grills that are professionally fitted, and in several instances jewelers manufacturing grills in this manner have been charged with practicing dentistry without a license.

Criticism and health hazards 
According to the American Dental Association (ADA) in June 2006, no studies have shown whether the long-term wearing of grills is safe.  If the grills fit properly and are worn only intermittently, wearers are at a low risk for dental problems, according to the ADA.  The ADA has warned, however, that grills made from base metals could cause irritation or allergic reactions, and that bacteria trapped under a grill worn on a long-term basis could result in gum disease, cavities, or even bone loss.  School districts in Alabama, Georgia, and Texas have banned grills for reasons both disciplinary and health-related.

Just as other hip hop fashions have been criticized, grills have been denounced by some commentators as expensive, ostentatious, and superficial displays that strain the finances of poor youth.

See also 
 Bling bling
 Gold teeth
 Ohaguro

References

Hip hop fashion
Types of jewellery
African-American culture
Dentistry
Hip hop terminology